Mukariini is a tribe of leafhoppers in the subfamily Deltocephalinae.

Taxonomy 
Mukariini has been considered to be a member of the subfamily Nirvaninae or in its own subfamily Mukariinae, but more recent molecular and morphological data has placed Mukariini in the subfamily Deltocephalinae.

Genera 
There are 17 genera in the tribe Mukariini:

References 

Deltocephalinae
Insect tribes